Eastwell Park is a large area of parkland and a country estate in the civil parish of Eastwell, adjoining Ashford, Kent, in England. Over time, successive buildings have served as homes to Sir Thomas Moyle, the Earls of Winchilsea and Nottingham, Prince Alfred, Duke of Edinburgh, and others.

The estate is now mainly a farming concern, raising crops and sheep. Part of the estate is landscaped to include a large shallow lake which can be fished and the distinctive Eastwell Towers. The largest building on the site today is Eastwell Manor, a stately home which is now operated as a country house hotel. The Manor and Towers are Grade II listed.

Eastwell Manor
The original country house at Eastwell was built for Sir Thomas Moyle between 1540 and 1550. One of the men employed on the estate was the bricklayer Richard Plantagenet, who was suspected to be an illegitimate son of Richard III.

The first house was replaced by one built in the neo-Elizabethan style between 1793 and 1799 for George Finch-Hatton to designs by Adam's former draughtsman, Joseph Bonomi (1739-1808).

A Victorian Tudor-style wing was later added; the house had seven bays and wings of three bays each.

In the mid-1860s, the 11th Earl of Winchilsea experienced serious financial difficulties, which eventually forced him to leave the property. On 4 December 1868 trustees appointed under the Winchilsea Estate Act (1865) entered into a contract to let Eastwell Park, together with its furnishings and effects, to the Duke of Abercorn for a period of five years. Lord Winchilsea had been obliged to vacate the property sometime prior to December 1868, and he was formally adjudged bankrupt on 5 October 1870.

Eastwell was next occupied by Prince Alfred, Duke of Edinburgh, the second son of Queen Victoria. He lived here with his family until 1893, when he inherited the duchy of Saxe-Coburg and Gotha in Germany. During that time, Queen Victoria was a frequent visitor and there are photographs of her skating on the lake. Prince Alfred's older brother, the future Edward VII, was also a visitor. In 1875, Prince Alfred's daughter Princess Marie - who later became queen of Romania - was born at the house. In her memoirs, she recalls "beautiful Eastwell with its great gray house, its magnificent park, with its herds of deer and picturesque Highland cattle, its lake, its woods, its garden with the old cedar tree which was our fairy mansion." In 1884, another of Alfred's children, Princess Beatrice - who later married into the Spanish Royal Family - was also born at Eastwell.

After the First World War, the Eastwell estate faced the same economic problems that also affected many other English stately homes. In the 1920s the main house was severely damaged by fire. A smaller house in a similar style was built on the same site in 1926–1928.

After many changes, Eastwell Manor is now operated as a country house hotel. There is an indoor swimming pool and a Champneys spa, and a nine-hole golf course has been laid out in the grounds. The rest of the estate is used for farming.

Eastwell Towers
The distinctive structure now known as Eastwell Towers stands a mile south-south west of the manor. It was the original main gatehouse to Eastwell Park and was built in 1848.

Home Farm
Home Farm at Eastwell Park was built at a distance from the main stately home. The large residence is surrounded by fields and lies close to the church of St Mary the Virgin.

St Mary the Virgin

Next to the large shallow lake at Eastwell Park is the ruined church of St Mary the Virgin, which is now cared for by the Friends of Friendless Churches. The church dates to the 14th century but became unused after First World War. A storm in 1951 caused severe damage:  parts of the nave and the choir fell down. The tower remains reasonably intact. Marble monuments once found in the church are now on view in the Victoria and Albert Museum. A memorial located in the former choir commemorates the grave of Richard Plantagenet, alleged to be the illegitimate son of Richard III.

George Finch-Hatton, 11th Earl of Winchilsea (1815–1887), his second wife Lady Elizabeth Georgiana (d. 1904, daughter of Francis Conyngham, 2nd Marquess Conyngham) as well as his only son George William Finch-Hatton, Viscount Maidstone (1852–1879) are buried in a simple grave in the overgrown part of the church cemetery.

References

External links
 A view of Eastwell Manor, built for the 9th Earl of Winchilsea (aerial view)
 A view of  Eastwell Manor, built for the 9th Earl of Winchilsea (front view)
 A view of Home Farm at Eastwell Park
 A view of St Mary the Virgin at Eastwell Park
 A view of the grave of Richard Plantagenet
 Eastwell Manor Hotel (official web page)

Buildings and structures demolished in 1926
Royal residences in the United Kingdom
Country houses in Kent
Borough of Ashford
Grade II listed buildings in Kent